United Kingdom responses to the COVID-19 pandemic refers to the overall UK response to the COVID-19 pandemic.

It may also refer to:

 British government response to the COVID-19 pandemic
 United Kingdom legislation connected with the COVID-19 pandemic